Jaanu is a 2012 Kannada romantic action film directed by Preetham Gubbi and produced by Jayanna Combines. Yash and Deepa Sannidhi are the lead actors while Rangayana Raghu, Sadhu Kokila, Shobaraj among others play the supporting roles. V. Harikrishna is the score and soundtrack composer. The movie was remade in Odia in 2018 as Love Express.

Cast 
 Yash as Siddharth
 Deepa Sannidhi as Jaanu 
 Rangayana Raghu
 Sadhu Kokila
  Laya Kokila 
 Chikkanna
 Madhu Guruswamy
 Raghav Uday 
  Shobaraj
 Rockline Sudhakar 
 Rajashekhar Naidu 
 Sangeetha 
 M. S. Umesh 
 Ravi varma

Production

Development
Following Haage Summane and Johny Mera Naam Preethi Mera Kaam, Preetham Gubbi joined with producers Jayanna Combines, as with earlier films.

Box office 
Jaanu was a much anticipated film and got a good opening. But the film met with mixed response upon release, although it went on to be commercially successful at the box office by completing 50 days of run.

Soundtrack

V. Harikrishna composed the film's background score and music for its soundtrack. The album consists of five tracks. Lyrics for the tracks were penned by Yogaraj Bhat and Jayant Kaikini. The album released on 13 May 2012.

Reception

Critical response 

A critic from The Times of India scored the film at 3 out of 5 stars and says "Yash rocks with a scintillating performance, Deepa Sannidhi shines as a girl from North Karnataka but could have done a better job. Music by V Harikrishna has some catchy tunes; cinematography by Krishna doesn’t stand up to his reputation". Srikanth Srinivasa from Rediff.com scored the film at 2.5 out of 5 stars and wrote "Harikrishna's music is adequate and so is Krishna's camera work. Director Preetham Gubbi should have dramatised the climax scenes a little more. Jaanu is an average entertainer that lacks the zing thing in the climax that could have left some impression on the audiences' minds". A critic from News18 India wrote "S. Krishna has handled his work quite efficiently. Hari Krishna's background music is more impressive than his composition work. There are many weak points in 'Jaanu'. Still it is good for a one time watch". A critic from Bangalore Mirror wrote  "But it is a surprise that filmmakers believe that just the presence of Rangayana Raghu and Sadhu Kokila is enough to make people laugh. It is a forced attempt at laughter that their characters try and does not have the effect".

References

External links
 

2012 films
2010s Kannada-language films
2010s action comedy-drama films
2012 romantic comedy-drama films
Films scored by V. Harikrishna
Indian action comedy-drama films
Indian romantic comedy-drama films
Films directed by Preetham Gubbi
2012 drama films
Kannada films remade in other languages